Victoria Falls Airport  is an international airport serving the Victoria Falls tourism industry, and is  south of the town of Victoria Falls, Zimbabwe.

Overview 
In April 2013, Exim Bank of China provided a $150 million loan to build the airport's new runway, taxiways and a new terminal to increase the airport's capacity from 500,000 to 1.7 million passengers annually.

The airport operates 12 hours per day, with immigration and customs services available. It offers facilities and services including aircraft parking, cargo and passenger handling, refuelling, weather information, restaurants, duty-free shops, and banking facilities. The airport has shuttle services to hotels and other places in town. There is a variety of tour operators and car rentals. The Zimbabwe Tourism Authority has an office stationed on the premises to assist travellers.

Airlines and destinations

See also 
 Transport in Zimbabwe
 List of airports in Zimbabwe

References

External links 

 Victoria Falls International Airport
 OurAirports – Victoria Falls

Victoria Falls
Airports in Zimbabwe